Just Go Ahead Now: A Retrospective is the first official compilation album by American jam band Spin Doctors, released in October 2000.

Track listing 

Notes
 Tracks 1–5 originally released on Pocket Full of Kryptonite, 1991
 Tracks 6–10 originally released on Turn It Upside Down, 1994
 Tracks 11–14 & 16 originally released on You've Got to Believe in Something, 1996
 Track 12 originally released on You've Got to Believe in Something, 1996 - different ending
 Track 17 originally released on Homebelly Groove...Live, 1992
 Track 15 original released on "She Used to Be Mine" cd single

Personnel
Chris Barron – vocals
Aaron Comess – percussion, conga, drums, Hammond organ, background vocals
Eric Schenkman – guitar, piano, vocals (Tracks 1–10,17)
Mark White – bass
Anthony Krizan – guitar, vocals (Tracks 11–16)

Additional musicians
John Bush – conga
Robin Clark – background vocals
Babi Floyd – background vocals
Frank Floyd – background vocals
Diva Gray – background vocals
Jeremy Gross – backmasking
Biz Markie – vocals, track 11
John Popper – harmonica, background vocals
Bernie Worrell – keyboards

Production
Producers: Bruce Dickinson (compilation), Frank Aversa, Peter Denenberg, Frankie La Rocka, Spin Doctors
Mastering: Joseph M. Palmaccio
A&R Coordination: Patty Matheny and Darren Salmeri
Packing Manager: John Christiana
Art direction: Howard Fitzson
Photography: Ken Scheles, Steve Eichner, Paul LaRaia, Starfile, Melis Van Iperen/Retna, AJ Barrett/Retna
Cover Photo: Steve Eichner

Spin Doctors albums
2000 compilation albums
Epic Records compilation albums